

Lodi is a Pashtun tribe from the Ghilji group of Pashtuns. In mythical genealogy, they have also been considered as being part of the Bettani tribal confederacy. The Lodi tribe consists of many sub-tribes, most of whom are now settled in the Tank, Frontier Region Tank, Lakki Marwat and Dera Ismail Khan districts of Khyber Pakhtunkhwa province of modern-day Pakistan. These tribes were nomadic for most of their existence and migrated to their present-day locations by crossing the Gomal Pass throughout different times in history.

Two tribes among the Lodi ended up establishing their own empires, the Sur tribe established the Sur Dynasty and the Prangi tribe established the Lodi Dynasty.

Lohani 
Lohani, also known as Nuhani, is the largest sub-group among the Lodi tribe. The Lohani migrated and crossed the Gomal Pass en masse during the late 1500s, into present-day Lodi territory and displaced other Lodi tribes such as Sur and Prangi that had settled in the region in prior times. Although other Lohani tribes had also made earlier deeper incursions into India, as far as Bihar, and settled therein during the days of the Lodi dynasty.

Earliest mentions of the Lohani 
The earliest mention of the Lohani tribes comes in the form of an inscription written on a tablet from 1496 AD in Bihar during the days of the Lodi dynasty. The inscription records the construction of a certain gate by Darya Khan Nuhani who is thereafter mentioned as one of the ''governors of the kingdom". The Lohani tribes were also mentioned by the Mughal Emperor Babur in his memoirs, the Baburnama, as Nuhani Afghans around 1529 AD. The earliest records mentions them as Nuhani rather than Lohani, which is the primary designation by which they are currently known today.

References 

Bettani Pashtun tribes
Pashto-language surnames